Cinema Bandi is a 2021 Indian Telugu-language Neo-noir dramedy film directed by debutant Praveen Kandregula. Produced by Raj Nidimoru and Krishna D.K., the film features several debutant actors. Set in a village near the Andhra–Karnataka border, the plot revolves around a group of young filmmakers try to make a film through a camera they found. The film premiered on Netflix on 14 May 2021. Cinema Bandi is featured in the Indian Panorama section at the 53rd IFFI where it won the Jury Special Mention.

Plot 
Veerababu, an autorikshaw driver, finds an expensive camera that was left in his auto. He initially tries to sell it or rent it out for money so that he could pay off the loan on his auto. However, after watching a TV program about lucrative low-budget films, he decides to make a film by himself using the camera. He picks up a love story given by an old man and teams up with his friend Ganapathi, who is a still photographer by profession. After a long hunt for the cast, they select a barber, Maridayya (who takes up the screen name Maridesh Babu), and a schoolgirl, Divya as their leads. They begin the shoot but face a struggle due to their inexperience and frequent interruptions from the fellow villagers. Soon after, Divya's marriage is forcefully arranged by her father, and she elopes with her boyfriend. Villagers blame Veerababu for it but he is adamant about continuing the shoot. They cast Manga, Maridesh's girlfriend as a replacement and restart filming.

Meanwhile, Sindhu, the woman who lost the camera is in pursuit to find it at any cost. She along with her friend enquires in the surrounding villages and photo studios about the missing camera. The shoot, on the other hand, is now going at a brisk pace with the villagers' support. While shooting from the top of a tree, the camera accidentally falls on the old man's head and breaks into pieces. The old man is hospitalized with severe injuries. Veerababu blames Ganapathi for the loss but to continue the shoot, the villagers decide to pool the amount for the camera's repair. Ganapathi gives the camera to a photo studio for repair, however, the studio owner informs Sindhu instead. She furiously takes away the camera from Ganapathi and leaves. Veerababu and others are in dismay that their film is halted.

Sindhu is disappointed about her damaged camera but after watching the film's footage from its memory card, she is impressed with their work. She edits the film and arranges for its screening in the village. Everyone is elated by watching it on the projector. She borrows another camera and helps Veerababu and his team to complete their film.

In the end, Sindhu asks the old man if he really wrote the story to which he replies that he can't even read.

Cast 
 Vikas Vasistha as Veerababu
 Sandeep Varanasi as Ganapathi
 Rag Mayur as Maridesh Babu
 Uma YG as Manga
 Sindhu Sreenivasa Murthy as Sindhu
 Viswanath Mandalika as Rude Villager
 Pujari Ram Charan as Basha
 Trishara as Divya
 Davani as Potti
 Sirivennela Yanamandhala as Gangotri
 Munivenkatappa as the old man
 Praveen Kandregula as the studio owner (cameo appearance)
 Vasanth Maringanti as Auto Rickshaw passenger (cameo appearance)

Production 
Praveen Kandregula met Raj and DK in 2018 at an interview. He and other writers mainly Vasanth Maringanti(lead writer) made a booklet about the ideas of making the film. The producers Raj and DK asked Praveen to make short film on the same story. Soon he made a short film based on the same story. Thus, the film is produced.

The film was filmed in 2019. It was earlier scheduled for theatrical release in 2020. Due to COVID-19 lockdown in India, it was rescheduled to premiere on Netflix. In an interview, Raj Nidimoru said that "We want to support indie filmmakers, specially first timers to make their films. The idea is not to call for stories because it’s not like we have a dearth of them. It’s about finding a filmmaker who has a story or script and wants to make this film. If it interests us, we want to help them make it without any hassle."

Soundtrack 

The audio of the film was released through Mango Music label. The first single was released on 7 May 2021. Lyrical version of the second single "Baavilona Kappa" was released on 12 May 2021.

Release 
The film was earlier scheduled for theatrical release in 2020, but was later premiered on 14 May 2021 on Netflix.

Reception 
The film became the most popular Indian film on Netflix. It is placed on the top spot in Netflix India Trendings in its debut week. Srivathsan Nadadhur of LetsOTT cited the film as "an utterly delectable, charming, that rises a toast to the magic of cinema." Another reviewer writing to NTV, stated "Cinema Bandi toys with themes like hope and redemption. While the premise is heart-warming, the treatment could have been way better." Ramnath Nandini of Scroll.in wrote that "the [film] has a winning set-up, oodles of heart and snarky humour, which compensate for the unstructured and rambling narrative and simplistic approach." Baradwaj Rangan of Film Companion South wrote "The only problem with Cinema Bandi is that it doesn’t have conflict. Everyone is too sweet, too nice, too pleasant...but the lack of conflict doesn’t mean that the film doesn’t have its other charms. This is a pleasant, little film about movie making and its low-key charm is its own reward."

Gautaman Bhaskaran of News18 agave a rating of 2.5/5 and wrote that "Cinema Bandi has a very interesting message about how video cameras have afforded splendid opportunities for especially short moviemakers, the film appears rather raw." Hindustan Times's Haricharan Pudipeddi said that the film is rooted in reality and it brims with the kind of energy we rarely witness in mainstream cinema.

Awards
53rd IFFI 
Jury Special Mention

References

External links 

 
Cinema Bandi at Netflix

2021 films
Telugu-language Netflix original films
2021 comedy-drama films
Indian comedy films
Indian comedy-drama films
2021 direct-to-video films
Indian avant-garde and experimental films
Indian direct-to-video films
2021 directorial debut films
Films set in Karnataka
Films shot in Karnataka
2020s Telugu-language films
Films shot in Andhra Pradesh
Films set in Andhra Pradesh